Hans Brandstetter (23 January 1854 – 4 January 1925) was an Austrian sculptor.

Biography
Brandstetter was born in Hitzendorf.  He was a pupil of Edmund von Hellmer at the Academy of Arts, Vienna. His first works, "The Flight of Lot from Sodom," “The Flute-Player," and "Plato," were honored with the prize given by the Academy. Among his later productions, the following are especially noteworthy: “The Forest Lily,” a bronze statue (City Park, Graz), “Prometheus,” and “The Return of the Prodigal.”  He died, aged 70, in Graz.

Notes

References

1854 births
1925 deaths
Austrian male sculptors
20th-century Austrian sculptors
19th-century sculptors
20th-century Austrian male artists